Outriders is an online-only cooperative action role-playing third-person video game developed by People Can Fly and published by Square Enix. It was released on April 1, 2021, for PlayStation 4, PlayStation 5, Stadia, Windows, Xbox One, and Xbox Series X/S. The game received mixed reviews from critics, with praise towards the gameplay, customization, and visuals, but criticism for the story and characters. While the game reached over 3.5 million players by May 2021, it's unclear if it was a commercial success because of Square Enix and People Can Fly releasing different statements on the game's commercial performance. Square Enix External Studios worked with People Can Fly for the development.

Gameplay
Outriders is a third-person shooter mixed with elements from role-playing games. In the beginning of the game, players create their custom characters and choose from four classes, each of them with unique abilities that the players can use. The four classes include the Trickster, which has the ability to manipulate time, the Pyromancer, which can manipulate fire, the Devastator, which can unleash seismic attacks, and the Technomancer, which uses turrets and other devices. These special skills have a short cooldown time and can be combined with other skills for maximum  effects. The game features a skill tree that allows players to unlock and upgrade their skills.

Players can use different weapons such as shotguns and assault rifles to defeat enemies, and firearms can be customized with weapon mods. Players can hide behind cover to shield themselves from enemy attacks, though health will only regenerate if the player manages to hurt or kill enemies. Players combat monstrous animals, human, and humanoid enemies. As the player progresses, the world level (the game's equivalent to gameplay difficulty) will increase. If the world level is high, it is more likely for the player to get high-end loot from defeated enemies.  Players can equip armors that offer protection against incoming damage, with each class having their own unique armor sets to collect.

The game incorporates various role-playing elements. As the players explore, they can explore different hub areas, talk to non-playable characters and complete side missions. In cutscenes a dialogue tree allows to decide the outcome of some conversations, though it does not affect the story's progression. The game can be played solo, but players can also complete the game together with two other players.

Plot
During the middle of the 21st Century, Earth has passed the point of no return as climate disasters grow more frequent and dangerous, surpassing humanity's ability to mitigate them. The major governments of Earth combine their resources under the newly formed Enoch Colonization Authority (ECA) in a last-ditch effort to preserve humanity on Enoch, a distant Earth-like planet. Two massive colony ships, the Caravel and the Flores, are built, each holding 500,000 colonists. Despite the Caravel suffering a catastrophic explosion in the middle of construction, the Flores successfully reaches Enoch's orbit in 2159, after an 83-year journey. The Outriders, a team of elite soldiers tasked with scouting the landing zone and paving the way for the colonists, are the first to land. However, they quickly discover the Anomaly, an unexpectedly massive and deadly energy storm. The Outriders attempt to warn the ECA to abort the colonization, but the ECA leadership instead send their own security forces to silence the Outriders by purging them. One of the Outriders, having survived exposure to the Anomaly, is mortally wounded during the fighting and is put back into cryostasis by Shira Gutmann, an ECA engineer.

The Outrider is awakened from cryostasis 31 years later in 2190, where they find that the ECA's attempted colonization has failed, with the Anomaly destroying all the colony's advanced technology and trapping all the colonists within the confines of a single mountain valley. Beset by hostile alien wildlife and left with dwindling resources, the colonists split in a massive civil war pitting the remnants of the ECA against the Insurgents, militant rebels who seek to overthrow the ECA. In addition, people who have survived exposure to the Anomaly like the Outrider have become "Altered", mutated humans possessing supernatural powers. The Outrider manages to reunite with Shira, now the de facto leader of the ECA, who tasks the Outrider with fighting against the Insurgents and eliminating their Altered.

Shira then explains that she and scientist Dr Abraham Zahedi are trying to trace the source of a mysterious signal originating from the other side of the Anomaly. Having recorded the exact frequency of the signal when they first landed, the Outrider heads out to meet Zahedi. Zahedi reveals that he possesses the last satellite uplink capable of connecting to the Flores, which remains in orbit with half of the colony's supplies. If the colonists can relocate to an area safe from the Anomaly, they can establish a new colony. Taking Zahedi and several companions, the Outrider traverses a number of hazardous environments and is finally able to breach the Anomaly and reach the other side, only to find a vast, barren desert littered with derelict human installations but inhabited by a humanoid native species violently hostile to humans, which they call "Ferals".

As the group continues to follow the signal, they discover the wreck of the Caravel, which has inexplicably reached Enoch before the Flores. Upon entering the Caravel, the group learns that after the Flores left Earth, the people left behind were able to rebuild the Caravel with a more advanced engine. With this engine, the Caravel was able to reach Enoch before the Flores. Upon landing, the Caravel colonists encountered a native race they called the Pax, named after their peaceful nature. The Pax civilization also kept the Anomaly in check, harnessing their own powers from it. The colonists craved this power and feared the Pax using it against them, so they violently subjugated the Pax in a vain attempt to gain their abilities before exterminating them. Left with no choice, the surviving Pax turned themselves into their current feral forms and wiped out the Caravel colonists, in turn unleashing the Anomaly across Enoch. The signal the Outriders had followed all this time was the Caravel's automated distress beacon. The Ferals assault the Caravel, but the Outrider and their group are able to fight them back, allowing Zahedi to signal the Flores to launch its cargo pods.

As the group watches the cargo pods land, they are met by a group of humans who have followed their trail, inspired by the stories of the Outrider. Still determined to fulfill their mission, the Outrider presses on to look for a suitable area to colonize.

Development
Polish developer People Can Fly started Outriderss development in 2015. Square Enix agreed to publish it and encouraged the team to expand on their vision. To develop the game, People Can Fly expanded the studio from having 40 members to more than 200 members. Outriderss gameplay reveal caused critics to compare the game to other live service games such as Destiny and Tom Clancy's The Division, though People Can Fly affirmed that Outriders is not a live service title and that it was a game that players can "start and finish". The game was designed with cooperative gameplay in mind, though the team put a lot of emphasis in writing the game's story, with the lead writer Joshua Rubin comparing it to Apocalypse Now and Heart of Darkness. The game's narrative features a much more serious tone than Bulletstorm as the studio wanted to prove that it can also write a mature story.

On May 16, 2018, Square Enix announced that they would publish the next title from People Can Fly. Announced at E3 2019, the game is set to be released for Stadia, PlayStation 4, PlayStation 5, Stadia, Windows, Xbox One, and Xbox Series X on April 1, 2021, after being delayed from its late 2020 timeline due to impacts from the ongoing COVID-19 pandemic. A game demo for the game was released in February 2021 and attracted 2 million players.

On March 15, 2021, it was announced that the Xbox version would be available at no additional cost to Xbox Game Pass subscribers. An expansion for the game titled Worldslayer was released on June 30, 2022.

Reception

Outriders received "mixed or average reviews" from critics, according to Metacritic.

Mack Ashworth from GameRevolution gave the game a 7.5/10, criticizing the story and characters, although praising the gameplay, level design, visuals, and combat animations, as well as the fact the game felt complete upon launch. In summary, he wrote that "it doesn’t innovate in any huge way and its many flaws are tough to ignore, but Outriders is a blast from a simpler past". Destructoid gave the game a 7/10, also praising it for being a complete game at full price and wrote, "Solid and definitely has an audience. There could be some hard-to-ignore faults, but the experience is fun".

GameSpots Phil Hornshaw gave the game an 8/10, praising that the "combination of cover shooting, loot shooter, co-op, and superpowers create intense tactical combat". Tom Bramwell of The Guardian felt the game captured "exactly what makes the genre tick", praising the guns as being universally fun to use. However, he noted the story would not appeal to everyone, citing the use of "wooden dialogue and sci-fi cliches".

Jon Ryan of IGN awarded the game a 7/10, lauding the game's focus on action, and feeling the multiplayer mode was the most enjoyable way to play. He further complimented the world design and visuals, and the fact the game had no microtransactions. On the other hand, he criticized the story as "lackluster", despite appreciating "genuinely intriguing twists", as well as the user interface and  bugs.

Jordan Forward of PCGamesN gave the game a 7/10 writing: "Outriders' fast-paced combat and imaginative sci-fi setting make it a journey worth taking. For all its flaws at launch, this could be the start of something very special for developer People Can Fly."

Sales
During its week of release, Outriders was the sixth best-selling retail game in the UK all-format charts,  the second best-selling  retail game in the Switzerland all-format charts,  and the PlayStation 4 and PlayStation 5 versions of the game debuted at the ninth and twentieth position of the Japan individual-format charts; with 6,596 and 2,431 physical copies sold, respectively. On Xbox, Outriders was the best-selling digital game during launch week. During its launch month of April 2021, it placed within the top ten best-selling digital games on Xbox, and within the top five best-selling digital games on PlayStation. While the game's launch was plagued with server issues, it attracted nearly 100,000 concurrent players on Steam. For the period between February 28 and April 3, 2021, Outriders was the third best-selling game in the US based on dollar sales.

The game attracted 3.5 million players one month after the game's initial launch. According to Square Enix, releasing the game at launch for Xbox Game Pass subscribers "worked in their favour" as it helped the game to build an install base in a short period of time.

It's unclear if Outriders was a commercial success or not, because while Square Enix stated it was "on track to become the company's next major franchise", People Can Fly have yet to receive royalties as of August 2021, leading them to suggest it hasn't yet turned a profit. People Can Fly estimate the game has sold between 2 and 3 million units.

Awards
In 2021, Outriders won the Technology award at the Central & Eastern European Game Awards (CEEGA), an annual award ceremony aimed at recognizing and promoting the best video games from Central and Eastern Europe.

References

External links
 

Cooperative video games
Multiplayer and single-player video games
PlayStation 4 games
PlayStation 5 games
Post-apocalyptic video games
Role-playing video games
Science fiction video games
Square Enix games
Stadia games
Third-person shooters
Unreal Engine games
2021 video games
Video games postponed due to the COVID-19 pandemic
Video games developed in Poland
Video games set on fictional planets
Windows games
Xbox One games
Xbox Series X and Series S games